Ekso Bionics Holdings Inc. is a company that develops and manufactures powered exoskeleton bionic devices that can be strapped on as wearable robots to enhance the strength, mobility, and endurance of industrial workers and people experiencing paralysis and mobility issues after a brain injury, stroke, or spinal cord injury. These robots have a variety of applications in the medical, military, industrial, and consumer markets. It enables individuals with any amount of lower extremity weakness, including those who are paralyzed, to stand up and walk.

The company's first commercially available product was called EksoGT (formerly eLEGS). Ekso Bionics is the original developer of HULC, now under military development by Lockheed Martin, and the current developers of EksoNR, which allows wheelchair users and those experiencing gait issues to stand and walk.

Ekso was selected as Wired magazine's number two "Most Significant Gadget of 2010", and was included in Time  magazine's "50 Best Innovations of 2010". Ekso Bionics was also featured in Inc. magazine as one of "5 Big Ideas for the Next 15 Years".

Background

The company was founded in 2005 under the name of Berkeley ExoWorks by Homayoon Kazerooni, Russ Angold and Nathan Harding, all members of the Berkeley Robotics and Human Engineering Laboratory at the University of California. Berkeley ExoWorks introduced ExoHiker and ExoClimber, both with a weight carrying capacity of 150 pounds.

In 2007 the company changed its name from Berkeley ExoWorks to Berkeley Bionics. Berkeley Bionics developed an untethered, hydraulically powered exoskeleton they called the Human Universal Load Carrier (HULC), and which could carry heavier loads than the previous models. The HULC system was announced publicly at the AUSA Winter Symposium on February 26, 2009, when an exclusive licensing agreement was reached with Lockheed Martin. Berkeley Bionics also debuted eLEGS, an intelligent, bionic exoskeleton that allows wheelchair users to stand and walk.

In 2011 Berkeley Bionics changed its name again, to its current name Ekso Bionics. It also changed the name of eLegs to Ekso.

In 2012, Ekso suits were registered as a class l device for hospital use in the US, and received a CE marking from the E.U.

In 2013, Ekso Bionics added Variable Assist, an intelligent and adaptive software providing the ability to provide adaptive amounts of power to either side of the body, making them unique in the field of medical exoskeletons.

In 2014, Ekso Bionics became a public company.

In 2015, Ekso Bionics began to develop new market with industrial prototype. Continues to expand into leading rehabilitation hospitals.

In 2016, Ekso Bionics appointed Thomas Looby interim chief executive officer, continues commercialization drive.

Also in 2016, Ekso Bionics was awarded FDA clearance for use with stroke and SCI patients. 

In 2019, Ekso Bionics launched EksoNR, the next iteration of the predicate device, EksoGT. 

In 2020, Ekso Bionics was awarded FDA clearance for use with acquired brain injury, the first in the market. 

in 2021, Ekso Bionics was awarded FDA clearance for use with multiple sclerosis, the first in the market. 

Also in 2021, Ekso Bionics appointed Steven Sherman, longtime board member, to chief executive officer after Jack Peurach stepped down.

Products

HULC

 
In 2009 Berkeley Bionics unveiled HULC, which stands for Human Universal Load Carrier. HULC is a more sophisticated and capable development of the above projects. It can carry a 200-pound load, and reduces the metabolic energy needed by the wearer to perform a given task. "In this way the device can significantly increase the range and length of tasks the wearer can perform."

In particular, HULC has potential military uses, and in 2009 a licensing and development agreement was reached with Lockheed Martin.

HULC lends itself to augmentation with devices that can be mounted on the back of its exoskeleton. One such device, the Lift Assist Device, lets operators carry front loads as well as loads on their back.  It also "allows single operators to lift heavy loads that currently require two or more people".

EksoNR (formerly eLEGS, EksoGT)

In 2010 Berkeley Bionics unveiled eLEGS, which stands for "Exoskeleton Lower Extremity Gait System". eLEGS is another pneumatically powered exoskeleton system, and allows paraplegics to stand and walk with crutches or a walker. The computer interface uses force and motion sensors to monitor the user's gestures and motion, and uses this information to interpret the intent of the user and translate it into action. Users can "put on and take off the device by themselves as well as walk, turn, sit down, and stand up unaided".

In 2011 eLEGS was renamed Ekso. Ekso weighs 45 pounds (20 kg), has a maximum speed of 2 mph (3.2 km/h) and a battery life of 6 hours. It is suitable for users weighing up to 220 pounds, who are between 5 ft 2in and 6 ft 4in tall and can transfer themselves from a wheelchair to a chair. It allows the user to "walk in a straight line, stand from a sitting position, stand for an extended period of time, and sit down from a standing position".

In 2013 The next generation Ekso GT with smart Variable Assist (marketed as SmartAssist outside the U.S.) software was released. It is the only exoskeleton available for rehabilitation institutions that can provide adaptive amounts of power to either side of the patient's body, challenging the patient as they progress through their continuum of care. The suit's patented technology provides the ability to mobilize patients earlier, more frequently and with a greater number of high intensity steps.

April 1, 2016 the FDA cleared the Ekso GT to be used with stroke patients and spinal cord injury patients up to level C7 (ASIA D classification). They are the first and only exoskeleton company to be able to provide a rehabilitative exoskeleton for the stroke population.

In 2017 Ekso Bionics released SmartAssist software in the US which is an upgrade to the Variable Assist software. SmartAssist allows for pre-gait activities in addition to gait training as well as advanced gait training techniques. The software upgrade also included updates for ease of use and to keep track of each patient's settings via a specific patient ID number. Ekso Bionics also launched Ekso Pulse which is a way to metrically track a patient's progression over the course of their rehab treatment via an online portal at the Ekso Bionics website.

In August 2019 Ekso Bionics released EksoNR (NeuroRehabilitation) to replace EksoGT.  The biggest change was the introduction of the new EksoView touchscreen controller and the associated upgrades to software.  EksoNR allows patients across the continuum of care to work on pre-gait activities (weight shifting, marching, squats, side tapping), various modes of walking, and advanced gait activities such as walking backwards, side-stepping, walking with no trajectory, and walking with added resistance.

In June 2020, Ekso Bionics received FDA approval to use EksoNR on patients with acquired brain injury, including traumatic brain injury.  EksoNR was the first and is the only exoskeleton cleared for this patient population. 

In June 2021, Ekso Bionics received FDA approval to use EksoNR with patients diagnosed with multiple sclerosis (MS), the first and only exoskeleton with this indication for use.

See also

 Indego
 Cyberdyne
 Rehabilitation robotics 
 ReWalk
 HAL (robot)

Notes

Other references

 Robotic devices help paralyzed become more independent USA Today, 6 January 2012.
 Meet the Real Bionic Man Wall Street Journal, 22 October 2011.
 Walking Again, With Help From an Exoskeleton The New York Times, 3 November 2011.
 US researchers create suit that can enable paraplegics to walk The Engineer, 25 October 2011.
 Johnson,  Carolyn Y. With device’s aid, the paralyzed take steps anew The Boston Globe, 15 September 2011.
 Wearable robot puts paralysed legs through their paces" Wired UK, 17 January 2012.
 Strickland,  Eliza (2012) "Good-bye, Wheelchair, Hello Exoskeleton" IEEE Spectrum, 49 (1): 30–32.

External links
 The next step in bionics CBS News, 9 October 2011.
 Wearable Robot Helps Paralyzed Detroit Firefighter Walk, Fox News, 6 January 2012.
 Making Strides 60 Minutes (Australian TV), 5 August 2011.
 Are Exoskeletons "Ableist"? Institute for Ethics and Emerging Technologies'', 28 January 2012.
  Audio interview with Russ Angold, co-founder and CTO of Ekso Bionics Robots Podcast 25 July 2014

Health care companies established in 2005
Mobility devices
Robotic exoskeletons
Robotics companies of the United States
Companies listed on the Nasdaq
Companies based in Berkeley, California
2005 establishments in California
American companies established in 2005